V-statistics are a class of statistics named for Richard von Mises who developed their asymptotic distribution theory in a fundamental paper in 1947. V-statistics are closely related to U-statistics (U for "unbiased") introduced by Wassily Hoeffding in 1948.  A V-statistic is a statistical function (of a sample) defined by a particular statistical functional of a probability distribution.

Statistical functions 

Statistics that can be represented as functionals  of the empirical distribution function  are called statistical functionals. Differentiability of the functional T plays a key role in the von Mises approach; thus von Mises considers differentiable statistical functionals.

Examples of statistical functions 

The k-th central moment is the functional , where  is the expected value of X. The associated statistical function is the sample k-th central moment,

The chi-squared goodness-of-fit statistic is a statistical function T(Fn), corresponding to the statistical functional

where Ai are the k cells and pi are the specified probabilities of the cells under the null hypothesis.

The Cramér–von-Mises and Anderson–Darling goodness-of-fit statistics are based on the functional

where w(x; F0) is a specified weight function and F0 is a specified null distribution. If w is the identity function then T(Fn) is the well known Cramér–von-Mises goodness-of-fit statistic; if  then T(Fn) is the Anderson–Darling statistic.

Representation as a V-statistic 

Suppose x1, ..., xn is a sample. In typical applications the statistical function has a representation as the V-statistic

where h is a symmetric kernel function. Serfling discusses how to find the kernel in practice.  Vmn is called a V-statistic of degree m.

A symmetric kernel of degree 2 is a function h(x, y), such that h(x, y) = h(y, x) for all x and y in the domain of h. For samples x1, ..., xn, the corresponding V-statistic is defined

Example of a V-statistic 

An example of a degree-2 V-statistic is the second central moment m2.

If h(x, y) = (x − y)2/2, the corresponding V-statistic is

which is the maximum likelihood estimator of variance. With the same kernel, the corresponding U-statistic is the (unbiased) sample variance:

.

Asymptotic distribution 

In examples 1–3, the asymptotic distribution of the statistic is different: in (1) it is normal, in (2) it is chi-squared, and in (3) it is a weighted sum of chi-squared variables.

Von Mises' approach is a unifying theory that covers all of the cases above.  Informally, the type of asymptotic distribution of a statistical function depends on the order of "degeneracy," which is determined by which term is the first non-vanishing term in the Taylor expansion of the functional T. In case it is the linear term, the limit distribution is normal; otherwise higher order types of distributions arise (under suitable conditions such that a central limit theorem holds).

There are a hierarchy of cases parallel to asymptotic theory of U-statistics. Let A(m) be the property defined by:
A(m):
 Var(h(X1, ..., Xk)) = 0 for k < m, and Var(h(X1, ..., Xk)) > 0  for k = m; 
 nm/2Rmn tends to zero (in probability). (Rmn is the remainder term in the Taylor series for T.)

Case m = 1 (Non-degenerate kernel):

If A(1) is true, the statistic is a sample mean and the Central Limit Theorem implies that T(Fn) is asymptotically normal.

In the variance example (4), m2 is asymptotically normal with mean  and variance , where .

Case m = 2 (Degenerate kernel):

Then nV2,n converges in distribution to a weighted sum of independent chi-squared variables:

The statistic V2,n is called a degenerate kernel V-statistic. The V-statistic associated with the Cramer–von Mises functional (Example 3) is an example of a degenerate kernel V-statistic.

See also 
 U-statistic
 Asymptotic distribution
 Asymptotic theory (statistics)

Notes

References 

 
 
 
 
 
 
 
 

Estimation theory
Asymptotic theory (statistics)